The Victoria Ground was the stadium of English football club Stoke City from 1878 to 1997

Victoria Ground may also refer to:
Victoria Ground (Leeds), a cricket ground in Leeds, used between 1846 and 1878
Victoria Ground (Stockton-on-Tees), a football and greyhound racing stadium used by Stockton F.C.
Victoria Ground (Bromsgrove), current home of Bromsgrove Rovers F.C.
Victoria Park (Hartlepool), home of Hartlepool United F.C., formerly known as the "Victoria Ground"
Victoria Ground (King William's Town), a sports ground in the Eastern Cape, South Africa
Victoria Park Football Ground, Bournemouth, current home of Bournemouth F.C.
The Victoria Ground, Cheltenham, cricket ground in Cheltenham